Valley of Peace is a 1956 Yugoslavian (Slovenian) war film directed by France Štiglic. It was in competition at the 1957 Cannes Film Festival, where John Kitzmiller received the Best Actor award for his role as Sgt. Jim.

The film was selected for screening as part of the Cannes Classics section at the 2016 Cannes Film Festival.

Cast
 John Kitzmiller as Sgt. Jim
 Evelyne Wohlfeiler as Lotti
 Tugo Štiglic as Marko
 Boris Kralj as Sturmführer
 Maks Furijan as Scharführer
 Janez Čuk as Leader
 Franjo Kumer as German soldier
 Polde Dežman as Kommissar (uncredited)
 Rudi Kosmač as Second lieutenant (uncredited)
 Pero Škerl as Kommandant (uncredited)

References

External links

1956 films
Yugoslav war films
Yugoslav black-and-white films
Films directed by France Štiglic
Slovene-language films
Films set in Yugoslavia
War films set in Partisan Yugoslavia
Yugoslav World War II films